Al Davis is an American former Negro league third baseman who played in the 1940s.

Davis played for the Newark Eagles in 1943. In 11 recorded games, he posted four hits in 39 plate appearances.

References

External links
 and Seamheads

Year of birth missing
Place of birth missing
Newark Eagles players
Baseball third basemen